Żory railway station is a railway station in Żory, Poland. As of 2012, it is served by PKP Intercity (TLK services) and Przewozy Regionalne (InterRegio and local services).

Train services

The station is served by the following services:

Intercity services (IC) Ustka - Koszalin - Poznań - Wrocław - Opole - Bielsko-Biała
Intercity services (IC) Bydgoszcz - Poznań - Leszno - Wrocław - Opole - Rybnik - Bielsko-Biała - Zakopane
Regional Service (KŚ)  Rybnik - Żory - Pszczyna
Regional services (KŚ)  Rybnik - Żory - Czechowice-Dziedzice - Bielsko-Biała Gł - Żywiec
Regional services (KŚ)  Gliwice – Knurów – Rybnik – Żory– Chybie – Skoczów – Ustron – Wisła

References

Żory railway station at kolej.one.pl

Railway stations in Poland opened in 1884
Railway stations in Silesian Voivodeship
Railway stations served by Przewozy Regionalne InterRegio
Railway station
Buildings and structures in Silesian Voivodeship